Twin Lake is an unincorporated community in Muskegon County of the U.S. state of Michigan.  It is a census-designated place (CDP) for statistical purposes. Local government services are provided by Dalton Township.  As of the 2000 census, the community population was 1,613. It is the home of Blue Lake Fine Arts Camp, the YMCA's Camp Pinewood, the Boy Scouts'  Gerber Scout Reservation and Owasippe Scout Reservation.

The Twin Lake CDP includes only the areas surrounding the Twin Lakes and the nearby North Lake and West Lakes in the northeast corner of Dalton Township. The Twin Lake ZIP code 49457 serves a much larger area, including much of northern and eastern Dalton Township, most of Cedar Creek Township to the east, parts of northern Egelston Township and Muskegon Township to the south, much of Blue Lake Township to the north and the southwest corner of Holton Township.

Geography

Demographics

As of the census of 2000, there were 1,613 people, 593 households, and 472 families residing in the community. The racial makeup of the community was 95.47% White, 0.56% African American, 1.67% Native American, 0.06% Asian, 0.37% from other races, and 1.86% from two or more races. Hispanic or Latino of any race were 1.92% of the population.

There were 593 households, out of which 35.1% had children under the age of 18 living with them, 71.5% were married couples living together, 5.2% had a female householder with no husband present, and 20.4% were non-families. 16.4% of all households were made up of individuals, and 6.6% had someone living alone who was 65 years of age or older.  The average household size was 2.72 and the average family size was 3.02.

In the community, the population was spread out, with 26.7% under the age of 18, 8.2% from 18 to 24, 29.4% from 25 to 44, 25.2% from 45 to 64, and 10.5% who were 65 years of age or older.  The median age was 36 years. For every 100 females, there were 103.9 males.  For every 100 females age 18 and over, there were 106.8 males.

The median income for a household in the community was $49,141, and the median income for a family was $51,341. Males had a median income of $42,112 versus $31,107 for females. The per capita income for the community was $18,501.  About 7.0% of families and 10.2% of the population were below the poverty line, including 10.9% of those under age 18 and 8.6% of those age 65 or over.

Notable people
Steven Rinella, hunting/outdoor writer and television host<ref>
Kyla Cross, 2022 Winter Guard International Independent World Class Bronze Medalist<ref>

References

Unincorporated communities in Muskegon County, Michigan
Census-designated places in Michigan
Unincorporated communities in Michigan
Census-designated places in Muskegon County, Michigan